Rock of Love Bus with Bret Michaels is the third season of Rock of Love with Bret Michaels and was confirmed by VH1's website in a blog on July 16, 2008. In the show, eligible women live on tour buses and travel with Bret Michaels, competing for his attention and affection. The show premiered on January 4, 2009. On December 29, 2008 it was announced Rock of Love Bus would be the final Rock of Love.

Production and legal problems
On September 28, 2008, a truck driven by a roadie hauling equipment for Rock of Love Bus, caused an accident when the driver fell asleep at the wheel. The truck crossed over the median and into oncoming traffic on Interstate 57 near West Frankfort, Illinois. The truck hit a pickup truck and a sports-utility vehicle. The two 19-year-old college students in the sports-utility vehicle were killed, and the two individuals in the pickup truck were seriously injured. The driver was charged with driving with a suspended license and moving violations. No other Rock of Love employees or crew were involved. According to a statement by VH1, Michaels asked that production be temporarily suspended.

Contestants

Elimination order

Contestants in bold indicates that they received V.I.P. Access/Passes.

 The contestant won the competition.
 The contestant won a solo date with Bret.
 The contestant won a group date with Bret.
 The contestant was eliminated.
 The contestant was going to receive a pass, but was eliminated.
 The contestant won a date with Bret, but was eliminated.
 The contestant won a date with Bret, but was eliminated before the elimination ceremony began.
 The contestant voluntarily withdrew from the competition.
 The contestant was added by Bret in Episode 5.

In Episode 1, Bret did not have a call-out order . Names are listed in alphabetical order since he called out the bottom seven first while the rest of the girls got on the bus for the next stop.
 In Episode 4, Maria was forced to withdraw from the competition for medical reasons.
 In Episode 5, upon announcing the new girls are safe, Bret said "Detroit" (Jenny), "Spo-Kami" (Kami), and "Brooklyn" (Jamie) were all safe.
In Episodes 5-6, even though the voiceover listed her name as "Jennifer" she was known as "Jenny" to the cast and Bret.
 In Episode 7, Kami decided she wasn't ready for Bret's lifestyle and left the tour. Names are listed in alphabetical order since Kelsey was called down first and was eliminated.
 In Episode 9, Bret had Ashley's pass in his hand ready to give to her, but first asked her where she stood with her ex. After Ashley hesitates, Bret decided to end her tour.
 In Episode 11, all of the girls went on a date with Bret.

Episodes

Hustle on the Bustle
First aired January 4, 2009 (2.1M viewers)

Michaels takes the show on the road. As he tours, a second bus brings along the women vying for his attention. The contest is specifically engineered to reflect the challenges of life on the road.

City: Louisville, Kentucky
Bottom 7: Brittaney, Gia, Heather, Marcia, Marci, Nikki, Stephanie
Eliminated: Gia, Heather, Marci, Nikki, Stephanie

Elimination Reasons
Gia: Gia was too crazy and Bret didn't think there was much else besides a party girl there.
Heather: Bret thought life on the road would be too crazy for her.
Marci: Marci had not spoken to Bret at all.
Nikki: Nikki had taken a shot out of Gia's genitals as well as several other raunchy antics.
Stephanie: Stephanie had not spoken to Bret at all.

Fifteen Weddings and Three Funerals
First aired January 11, 2009

After all 15 recite their wedding vows, three girls must stay behind.

City: Greenfield, Indiana
Challenge: Wedding Vows
Challenge Winners: Brittanya, Taya, Farrah
Bottom 6: Brittaney, Constandina, Marcia, Megan, Melissa, Samantha
Eliminated: Constandina, Megan, Samantha

Elimination Reasons
Constandina: Constandina had previously told Bret that she had taken a religious vow of abstinence and would not have "all the way sex" for years.
Megan: Megan gave Bret stuffed animals during the challenge, which didn't appeal to him.
Samantha: She was very nervous and stumbled her words during the wedding vow challenge. It was also hinted that she wasn't confident or noticeable enough.

It's Babes on Ice
First aired January 18, 2009

There's a chill in the air as the 12 remaining contestants vie on ice against University of Illinois Women's Hockey [Club] and special guest player, Lacey. Tempers catch fire when one of the contestants is accused of secretly calling a boyfriend.

City: Danville, Illinois
Guest: Lacey Conner
Challenge: Baby Hockey 
Challenge Winners: Beverly, Brittaney, Maria, Melissa
Bottom 3: Beverly, Brittaney, Marcia
Eliminated: Brittaney, Melissa

Elimination Reasons
Brittaney: Bret felt that she was too needy and emotional for him to handle, and had a history of stealing socks.
Melissa: Melissa had disrespected Bret by calling her boyfriend and saying bad things about him. She later denied even having a cell phone on her.

Roadies
First aired January 25, 2009

The ten remaining girls play roadie, racing to clear the stage. Winners get better seats at Michaels' concert.

City: Chicago, Illinois
Challenge: Roadie Challenge
Challenge Winners: Ashley, Brittanya, Beverly, Natasha
Bottom 3: Beverly, Marcia, Mindy
Withdrew: Maria
Eliminated: Marcia

Elimination Reasons
Maria: Maria had a medical condition and had to be rushed to the hospital between episodes.
Marcia: Bret didn't have much of a connection with her and felt she was only there to party. Marcia also gave away a gift during the concert that Bret had given her.

Eight Is Not Enough
First aired February 8, 2009

The eight left become eleven when Michaels brings in new blood to amp the competition.

City: St. Louis, Missouri
New Girls: Jamie, Jenny, Kami
Challenge: Makeovers
Challenge Winners: Farrah, Natasha, Mindy
Bottom 2: Brittanya, Natasha
Eliminated: Natasha

Elimination Reasons
Natasha: Bret claimed that they never got beyond the friendship line.

Mud Bowl III
First aired February 15, 2009

The contestants split into teams for a Mudbowl, with Michaels and the most valuable player going solo overnight.

City: Nashville, Tennessee
Challenge: Mud Bowl
Pink Bus - Fallen Angels: Ashley, Farrah, Kelsey, Jamie, Jenny
Blue Bus - Sweethearts: Brittanya, Beverly, Kami, Mindy, Taya
Challenge Winners: Sweethearts
MVP: Mindy
Bottom 2: Brittanya, Jenny,
Eliminated: Jenny

Elimination Reasons
Jenny: Jenny's father had died and Bret thought the road would be a negative environment for her.

Truck Stop Games
First aired March 1, 2009

The contestants divide into three teams for competitive truck stop games.

City: Birmingham, Alabama
Challenge: Truck Stop Games
Blue Team: Ashley, Beverly, Kami
Green Team: Brittanya, Mindy, Jamie
Yellow Team: Kelsey, Farrah, Taya
Challenge Winners: Yellow Team
Withdrew: Kami
Eliminated: Kelsey

Elimination Reasons
Kami: Ashley had gone into Bret's room for what the viewers assume is sex. This upset Kami and made her realize that she wasn't ready for Bret's lifestyle.
Kelsey: After Kelsey's meltdown, it convinced Bret that she was too young and couldn't handle the pressure of the show anymore.

Bikini Day Care
First aired March 8, 2009

The seven remaining competitors take care of children at a pool party in Panama City Beach, Florida.

City: Panama City Beach, Florida
Challenge: Kid's Kiddie Pool Party
Challenge Winner: Ashley
Bottom 2:  Farrah, Taya
Eliminated: Farrah

Elimination Reasons
Farrah: Bret realized that aside from her good looks, he and Farrah didn't have much of a connection.

Exes and Oh's
First aired March 15, 2009 (2.4M viewers)

Two women from Michaels' past, ex-girlfriend Ambre and runner-up Heather from the first Rock of Love, question the men of the competitors' past.
Brittanya's Ex Royal T discloses that he and Brittanya had sex right before she left for the competition. Beverly freaked out her Ex-Husband did not show up and disclosed she was a teen mother at 17. Jaz, Taya's Ex ends up having an angry outburst. Mindy admits she cheated in her past relationship. It's revealed that Ashley still lives with her ex James, and he claims they still sleep together.

City: St. Augustine, Florida
Guests: Ambre Lake and Heather Chadwell
Challenge: Ex Interrogation
Bottom 3: Ashley, Beverly, Brittanya
Eliminated: Brittanya, Ashley

Elimination Reasons
Brittanya: Brittanya tried to assault Heather and spat on Ambre. Bret let her go because he didn't like her disrespecting his friends.
Ashley:  Bret had Ashley's pass in his hand ready to give to her, but first asked her where she stood with her ex. After Ashley hesitated, Bret decided to end her tour.

Duet to Me One More Time
First aired March 22, 2009

The four remaining girls sing along with Michaels with lyrics they've written to one of his songs.

City: Orlando, Florida
Challenge: Singing Performing
Challenge Winner: Beverly, Taya
Bottom 2: Beverly, Mindy
Eliminated: Beverly

Elimination Reasons
Beverly: She became too emotional and "was more in love with the idea of being in love with a rockstar".

Double Dates
First aired April 5, 2009

As the finale approaches, Michaels and the remaining three contestants try fantasy dates, but competition between the girls is escalating as the end draws near.

City: Miami, Florida
Bottom Two: Jamie, Taya
Eliminated: Jamie

Elimination Reasons
Jamie: Bret misunderstood something she said as she didn't want to settle down in a relationship yet.

Bret's Rock of Love III
First aired April 12, 2009 (3.2M viewers)

The two remaining contestants, Taya and Mindy, join Michaels in the Dominican Republic for their final chance to win him.

Destination: Dominican Republic
Dates: Bret takes each girl on an individual date.
Mindy's Date: Tango lessons, dinner, walk along the beach, and an overnight stay in Bret's room.
Taya's Date: A zip-line excursion, dinner, and drinks in Bret's room.
Bret's Rock of Love: Taya
Eliminated: Mindy

Reunion Show
First aired April 19, 2009

In the reunion show, the contestants look back, becoming emotional and even violent as they share memories of the experience.

After the show

Ashley Klarich, Beverly Palmer, Brittaney Starr, Brittanya O'Campo, Farrah Sinclair, Gia Lynn, Marcia Alves, and Natasha McCollum all appeared on Charm School with Ricki Lake. Ashley and Marcia were first and second runners-up respectively.
Marcia Alves was a contestant on the canceled third season of "I Love Money", where it is believed she was eliminated on the first episode. She also appeared on the show's fourth season, where she was eliminated on the fourth episode.
Mindy Hall and Brittanya O'Campo appeared on the fourth season of I Love Money in which Mindy won and Brittanya came in sixth place.

References

External links

 

American dating and relationship reality television series
VH1 original programming
2000s American reality television series
2009 American television series debuts
2009 American television series endings
Television series by 51 Minds Entertainment
Television shows filmed in Kentucky
Television shows filmed in Indiana
Television shows filmed in Illinois
Television shows filmed in Missouri
Television shows filmed in Tennessee
Television shows filmed in Alabama
Television shows filmed in Florida
Television shows filmed in the Dominican Republic